Seohara is a town and a municipal board situated between Sahaspur and Dhampur in  Bijnor district in the Indian state of Uttar Pradesh.

Geography
It has an average elevation of 211 metres (692 feet).

Seohara is situated on Haridwar- Moradabad State highway . In east of Seohara is situated another town called  Sahaspur, West is Dhampur, south, Raja Ka Tajpur, and in north flows the river Ramganga about eight kilometers from the town.

Demographics
 India census, Seohara had a population of 43,985. Males constitute 53% of the population and females 47%. Seohara has an average literacy rate of 68%, higher than the national  of 59.5%: male literacy is 74%, and female literacy is 62%. In Seohara, 17% of the population is under 6 years of age. In 1901 the population of the town was 10,062 (as per Imperial Gazetteer 2 of India, vol II, Page 283).

Notable people 

 Asaf Ali
 Hifzur Rahman Seoharwi

References

Cities and towns in Bijnor district